James Banford Thompson (1832 – 18 November 1901) was an Irish-born politician, surveyor and land valuer in New South Wales, Australia.

He was born in Fintona, County Tyrone, to postmaster William Thompson and Jane  Jeffries. His family migrated to Australia around 1836. He worked as a licensed surveyor, and on 11 February 1861 married Margaret Catherine Carroll; they would have twelve children. In 1877 he was elected to the New South Wales Legislative Assembly for Queanbeyan, serving until his resignation in 1881, to accept an appointment as a railway land valuer. He was made bankrupt in 1884.

Thompson died at Ryde in 1901.

References

 

1832 births
1901 deaths
Members of the New South Wales Legislative Assembly
19th-century Australian politicians